Bobolice is a town in West Pomeranian Voivodeship, north-west Poland.

Bobolice may also refer to the following villages:
Bobolice, Lower Silesian Voivodeship (south-west Poland)
Bobolice, Silesian Voivodeship (south Poland)